Maung Doh Cherry Myay is a 1963 Burmese black-and-white drama film starring Win Oo and Khin Than Nu. The film showed the nice scene of Mandalay Thingyan Festival.

Cast
Win Oo as Mg Ko U
Khin Than Nu as Khin Than Nu

References

1963 films
1960s Burmese-language films
Films shot in Myanmar
Burmese black-and-white films
1963 drama films
Burmese drama films